Morandini is an Italian surname. Notable people with the surname include:

Fabio Morandini (born 1945), Italian Nordic combined skier
Francesco Morandini (c. 1544 – 1597), Italian painter
Giovanni Battista Morandini (born 1937), Vatican diplomat 
Jean-Marc Morandini (born 1965), French journalist
Marcello Morandini (born 1940), Italian designer and architect
Mickey Morandini (born 1966), American baseball player
Norma Morandini (born 1948), Argentine politician

Italian-language surnames